Angus MacRae (born 1967) is a minister of the Free Church of Scotland who served as Moderator of the General Assembly 2018/2019.

Life
He was born in Glasgow in 1967 the son of Donald and Sina MacRae but was raised and educated at Laxdale on the Isle of Lewis. He attended the Nicolson Institute in Stornoway then studied Divinity at Edinburgh University and the Free Church of Scotland College. He was ordained by the Free Church of Scotland in 1992.  He originally served as minister of Kilwinning and Saltcoats in Ayrshire.

In 2001 he moved north to Dingwall and served the joint parishes of Dingwall and Strathpeffer.

In October 2017 he was elected Moderator for 2018/2019 in succession to Rev Derek Lamont of St Columba's Free Church in Edinburgh.
MacRae is also Chair of the Board of Ministry for the Free Church. His address to the General Assembly in May 2018 was entitled "The Shalom of Jesus: Peace in a World of Rage".

MacRae continues as minister of Dingwall and Strathpeffer.

Family

He is married to Ann MacRae, of NHS Highland, and they have three children.

References

1967 births
Clergy from Glasgow
People educated at the Nicolson Institute
20th-century Ministers of the Free Church of Scotland
Alumni of the University of Edinburgh
Living people
21st-century Ministers of the Free Church of Scotland